Børge Olsen-Hagen (10 February 1883 – 13 September 1936) was a Norwegian journalist, newspaper editor and politician.

He was born in Stavanger, and was editor of the newspaper 1ste Mai from 1920 to 1936. He was elected representative to the Stortinget for the periods 1925–1927, 1928–1930, 1931–1933 and 1934–1936, for the Labour Party.

References

1883 births
1936 deaths
Norwegian newspaper editors
Politicians from Stavanger
Labour Party (Norway) politicians
Members of the Storting